Persona is an EP released by the Australian band Karnivool. The disc was originally released on 1 March 2001 via Sic Squared Records, selling 2,000 copies. It was re-released on the band's own label on 12 December 2005 via MGM Distribution, whilst the band were touring for their album Themata. The re-release reaching #1 on the AIR Charts Top 20 Singles (Independent Distribution) chart. The re-release featured a different inkblot cover. In 2006, the EP was nominated for 'Best Performing Single/EP' at the inaugural Australian Independent Record Labels Association (AIR) Awards. The EP was subsequently released in the United States on 24 April 2007.

Track listing

Personnel
 Ian Kenny – lead vocals
 Drew Goddard – guitar, backing vocals
 Jonathon Stockman – bass
 Raymond Hawking – drums

References

2001 EPs
Karnivool albums